Josh Rushing is an American broadcast journalist and photographer. He is a correspondent for the Emmy-winning documentary series, Fault Lines, on Al Jazeera English. He is also a former officer of the United States Marine Corps (USMC).

Early life
Rushing was born in Lewisville, Texas in 1972.

Career

Military service
Rushing enlisted in the United States Marine Corps in 1990 and completed basic training at the Marine Corps Recruit Depot San Diego, California.

 He was selected for Public Affairs and attended the Defense Information School (DINFOS) in 1991. He was selected for the Marine Enlisted Commissioning Education Program (MECEP) and studied at the University of Texas at Austin where he received a dual degree in Ancient History and Classic Civilization in 1999. Rushing became a Mustang upon his graduation from UT and moved to Quantico, Virginia, to further his military officer training at The Basic School (TBS). Though slated to be a Marine Corps aviator at TBS, a hearing loss prevented Rushing from completing flight school. Instead, he returned to Public Affairs and reported to Marine Corps Air Station Miramar in San Diego, California. Rushing moved to Los Angeles in 2002 where he represented the Marine Corps in Hollywood in the Marine Corps Motion Picture and Television Liaison Office.

Aware of future military operations in the Middle East, Rushing volunteered to deploy with forward units before the invasion of Iraq in 2003. Rushing was assigned to United States Central Command (CENTCOM) in Doha, Qatar, during Operation Iraqi Freedom where he served as a spokesperson to General Tommy Franks. Unbeknownst to him, an independent film, Control Room, captured his efforts to communicate the American message on Al Jazeera Arabic. The documentary debuted at the Sundance Film Festival in 2004 and enjoyed theatrical release across the world. After the Pentagon ordered him not to comment on the film, he left the Marine Corps after 14 years of active duty service in October 2004 and later helped start Al Jazeera English in 2005.

Broadcasting work
Rushing has been with Al Jazeera English since the run-up to its launch. As an international correspondent, Rushing has hosted and produced programs all over the world. So far in 2011 Rushing has filmed two Fault Lines episodes in Mexico - "Mexico: Impunity and Profits", and "Mexico's Hidden War" - plus a third in Colombia. He has also traveled to Iraq, for the eighth time, to provide special news coverage marking the 6-month milestone before the planned withdrawal of the U.S. military.

Writings
Rushing’s book, Mission Al Jazeera: Build a Bridge, Seek the Truth, Change the World, was published by Palgrave-MacMillan in 2007. The book blends his personal story with a unique behind-the-scenes look into the controversial AlJazeera broadcast networks. Rushing is also published in Reader's Digests 10th Anniversary of 9/11 special edition.

Rushing blogged regularly for AJE and the Huffington Post before beginning his own online journal.

Personal life
He is married, with a daughter and four sons.

Notes

References
Books

External links
Josh Rushing Official Website
Official Control Room Website

Former Marine in media glare as he joins Al-Jazeera, USA Today, September 28, 2005
The Education of Lieutenant Rushing, Mother Jones, November/December 2006
 Al Jazeera's (Global) Mission, Fast Company, April 2006
Al Jazeera Hires an Ex-Marine, Time magazine, September 27, 2005
Marine Lands in Film, Collides With Superiors, Los Angeles Times, August 2, 2004
Democracy Now! interview, June 20, 2007

Living people
1972 births
United States Marine Corps officers
United States Marine Corps personnel of the Iraq War
American male journalists
Al Jazeera people
American public relations people
Writers from Texas